Air Commodore Robert Marsland Groves,  (3 January 1880 – 27 May 1920) was a Royal Navy officer involved with naval aviation during the First World War. He was awarded his Aviator's Certificate no. 969 on 15 November 1914. After transferring to the Royal Air Force in 1918, he served as Deputy Chief of the Air Staff and held high command in the Middle East. He was killed in a flying accident in 1920 aged 40 whilst serving in Egypt.

Early life
Groves was born on 3 January 1880 at Stretford in Lancashire, England, the son of James Grimble Groves, a brewer and Conservative MP. He was educated at Rossall School.

Naval service
Groves joined the Royal Navy as a midshipman in the 1890s, rising to sub-lieutenant by the summer of 1899 and then lieutenant on 15 February 1900. In September 1902 Groves was posted to the torpedo school ship HMS Vernon, to qualify as torpedo lieutenant.

Groves was promoted to commander on 22 June 1911 and the following year, on 26 November 1912, he was appointed Flag Commander to the Commander-in-Chief Mediterranean on HMS Inflexible. He served in the First World War as Assistant Director of the Air Department at the Admiralty and then as Officer Commanding No. 1 Squadron RNAS before returning to the Admiralty to be Assistant Secretary of the Air Board. He was awarded the Distinguished Service Order in 1919, the citation for which was published in a supplement to the London Gazette on 22 June, reading:

Royal Air Force
After the War, Groves became Deputy Chief of the Air Staff and Director of Operations and Intelligence. He went on to be Acting Air Officer Commanding RAF Middle East Area in 1919 and Air Officer Commanding Egyptian Group in 1920.

Groves died aged 40 on 27 May 1920 in Egypt from injuries received in an aircraft crash when his Bristol Fighter crashed after engine failure on takeoff at Almaza. He was buried at the Cairo New British Protestant Cemetery.

References

External links
Air of Authority – A History of RAF Organisation – Air Commodore R M Groves

|-

|-

1880 births
1920 deaths
Royal Navy officers
Royal Air Force officers
Royal Air Force generals of World War I
Companions of the Order of the Bath
Companions of the Distinguished Service Order
Recipients of the Air Force Cross (United Kingdom)
Officiers of the Légion d'honneur
Foreign recipients of the Distinguished Service Medal (United States)
Aviators killed in aviation accidents or incidents
Aviation pioneers
English aviators
People educated at Rossall School
People from Stretford
Recipients of the Distinguished Service Medal (US Army)
Victims of aviation accidents or incidents in Egypt
Victims of aviation accidents or incidents in 1920
Military personnel from Lancashire